Joris Steve Marveaux (born 15 August 1982) is a French retired footballer who played as a midfielder.

Club career
Marveaux made his professional debut for Lorient on 28 March 2003. Marveaux was a key part of Montpellier's league winning side in 2012.

International
He made his Martinique national football team debut on 15 June 2019 in the 2019 CONCACAF Gold Cup game against Canada, as a starter.

International goals
Scores and results list Martinique's goal tally first.

Coaching career
After retiring in the summer 2019, Marveaux was hired as head coach of Montpellier's women's reserve team. He left the position at the end of May 2020.

Personal life
Marveaux was born in France to a Martiniquais father and a French mother. His younger brother, Sylvain Marveaux, is also a professional footballer.

Honours
Montpellier
 Ligue 1 (1): 2011–12

References

External links
 
 
 
 

1982 births
Living people
Association football midfielders
Martiniquais footballers
Martinique international footballers
French footballers
Martiniquais people of French descent
French people of Martiniquais descent
Montpellier HSC players
FC Lorient players
Clermont Foot players
Ligue 1 players
Ligue 2 players
Footballers from Brittany
Black French sportspeople
2019 CONCACAF Gold Cup players
Sportspeople from Vannes